Here, My Love is the fifth studio album by American R&B singer Case. It was released on June 15, 2010 through Real Talk Entertainment.

Track list

Charts

References

2010 albums
Case (singer) albums
Albums produced by Cozmo
Albums produced by Big Hollis
Real Talk Entertainment albums